Bourbonnais Township  is one of seventeen townships in Kankakee County, Illinois, USA.  As of the 2010 census, its population was 40,137 and it contained 15,153 housing units.

Bourbonnais is the home of Olivet Nazarene University, a private liberal arts Christian college affiliated with the Church of the Nazarene. Bourbonnais and Olivet Nazarene University are also the summer home of the Chicago Bears, who hold their summer training camp at Olivet.

History
Bourbonnais Township was formerly a township of Will County until Kankakee County was created in 1853.

Geography

Cities, towns, villages
 Bourbonnais (east three-quarters)
 Bradley (vast majority)
 Kankakee (north edge)

Unincorporated towns
 Altorf at 
 Indian Oaks at 
(This list is based on USGS data and may include former settlements.)

Adjacent townships
 Manteno Township (north)
 Sumner Township (northeast)
 Ganeer Township (east)
 Aroma Township (southeast)
 Kankakee Township (south)
 Limestone Township (southwest)
 Rockville Township (northwest)

Cemeteries
The township contains these three cemeteries: Maternity BVM, Smith, and All Saints'.

Major highways
  Interstate 57
  U.S. Route 45
  Illinois Route 50

Airports and landing strips
 Karlock Airport

Landmarks
 Kankakee River State Park

Demographics

Government
The township is governed by an elected Town Board of a Supervisor and four Trustees.  The Township also has an elected Assessor, Clerk, Highway Commissioner and Supervisor.  The Township Office is located at 1350 Armour Road, Bourbonnais, Illinois 60914.

Political districts
 Illinois's 11th congressional district
 State House District 75
 State House District 79
 State Senate District 38
 State Senate District 40

School districts
 Bradley Elementary School District 61
 Bourbonnais Elementary School District 53
 Bradley-Bourbonnais Community High School District 307
 Kankakee School District 111
 Manteno Community Unit School District 5
 Momence Community Unit School District 1

References
 
 United States Census Bureau 2007 TIGER/Line Shapefiles
 United States National Atlas

External links
 Kankakee County Official Site
 City-Data.com
 Illinois State Archives

Townships in Kankakee County, Illinois
Populated places established in 1853
Townships in Illinois